The Waiotu River is a river of the Northland Region of New Zealand's North Island. One of the headwaters of the Wairua River system, it flows generally south from its sources 15 kilometres southeast of Kawakawa. Its waters join with those of the Whakapara River to form the Wairua River.

See also
List of rivers of New Zealand

References

Rivers of the Northland Region
Rivers of New Zealand